P. spinosa may refer to:
 Paa spinosa, a frog species
 Pallenis spinosa, a flowering plant species in the genus Pallenis
 Panlongia spinosa, an extinct Cambrian arthropod species in the genus Panlongia
 Phylloxylon spinosa, a legume species
 Pochyta spinosa, a jumping spider species in the genus Pochyta
 Prostanthera spinosa, a mintbush species in the genus Prostanthera
 Protosagitta spinosa, a predatory marine worm species in the genus Protosagitta
 Prunus spinosa, a deciduous large shrub species
 Pseudomonas spinosa, a Gram-negative soil bacterium species
 Pteroneta spinosa, a sac spider species in the genus Pteroneta
 Pultenaea spinosa, a flowering plant  species in the genus Pultenaea
 Pyrenecosa spinosa, a wolf spider species in the genus Pyrenecosa

Synonyms
 Poinciana spinosa, a synonym for Caesalpinia spinosa, the tara, a tree species native to Peru

See also
 Spinosa (disambiguation)